Patricia Anne McKillip (February 29, 1948 – May 6, 2022) was an American author of fantasy and science fiction. She has been called "one of the most accomplished prose stylists in the fantasy genre", and wrote predominantly standalone fantasy novels. Her work won numerous awards, including the World Fantasy Award for Lifetime Achievement in 2008.

Personal life
McKillip was born in Salem, Oregon to Wayne and Helen ( Roth) McKillip. She grew up in Oregon, Great Britain, and Germany. She attended the College of Notre Dame (Belmont, California) and San Jose State University (San Jose, California), where she earned her BA and MA degrees in English in the early 1970s. 

McKillip was married to David Lunde, a poet.
She died on May 6, 2022, at the age of 74 at her home in Coos Bay, Oregon.

Career
McKillip's first publications were two short children's books, The Throme of the Erril of Sherill and The House on Parchment Street. Her first novel, The Forgotten Beasts of Eld, was published in 1974, when she was 26 years old, and won the World Fantasy Award in 1975. She next wrote the Riddle-Master trilogy (1976–1979), which scholar Peter Nicholls described as "a work of classic stature". It was selected as part of Gollancz's Fantasy Masterworks series.

Since 1994, McKillip's writing comprised purely standalone novels. Most of her novels feature cover paintings by Kinuko Y. Craft. On writing fantasy, she said, "The tropes of mythology and symbolism are the basics. It's like a notation in music; you can change it in really wacky ways, but the sound is always the same, the sound is always there. As long as we need these symbols, then the stories will be written. But if we destroy the old symbols, then we might just have to come up with new ones—who knows?" Critic Brian Stableford described McKillip as "one of the most accomplished prose stylists in the fantasy genre", while Nicholls and John Clute considered her "perhaps the most impressive author of fantasy story still active".

McKillip was the Guest of Honor at the 1985 Mythcon and the 1999 World Fantasy Convention, and in 2005 the Journal of the Fantastic in the Arts published a special issue on her work. She received the World Fantasy Award for Life Achievement in 2008.

Awards
McKillip holds the record for the most Mythopoeic Fantasy Awards (four) and nominations (fifteen). She has also won World Fantasy Awards for Best Novel, as well as for Life Achievement.

Bibliography

References

Citations

Sources

Further reading

External links

 patriciamckillip.com (unofficial)
 McKillip at Fantastic Fiction
 
 
 Novel synopses, cover art, and reviews at FantasyLiterature.net
 "Vengeance as a theme in the writings of Patricia A. McKillip"

1948 births
2022 deaths
20th-century American novelists
20th-century American short story writers
20th-century American women writers
21st-century American novelists
21st-century American short story writers
21st-century American women writers
American fantasy writers
American women novelists
American women short story writers
Novelists from Oregon
San Jose State University alumni
Women science fiction and fantasy writers
World Fantasy Award-winning writers
Writers from Salem, Oregon